The Public Distribution System (PDS) is an Indian food security system that was established by the Government of India under the Ministry of Consumer Affairs, Food and Public Distribution to distribute food and non-food items to India's poor at subsidised rates. Major commodities distributed include staple food grains, such as wheat, rice, sugar and essential fuels like kerosene, through a network of fair price shops (also known as ration shops) established in several states across the country. Food Corporation of India, a government-owned corporation, procures and maintains the PDS.

As of June 2022, India has the largest stock of grain in the world besides China, the government spends  billion. Distribution of food grains to poor people throughout the country is managed by state governments. As of 2011 there were 505,879 fair price shops (FPS) across India. Under the PDS scheme, each family below the poverty line is eligible for 35 kg of rice or wheat every month, while a household above the poverty line is entitled to 15 kg of foodgrain on a monthly basis, redeemable with a card. However, there are concerns about the efficiency of the distribution process.

In coverage and public expenditure, it is considered to be the most important food security network. However, the food grains supplied by the ration shops are not enough to meet the consumption needs of the poor. The average level of consumption of PDS seeds in India is only 1 kg per person per month. The PDS has been criticised for its urban bias and its failure to serve the poorer sections of the population effectively. The Targeted PDS is costly and gives rise to much corruption in the process of extricating the poor from those who are less needy.

History 
This scheme was first started on 14 January 1945, during the Second World War, and was launched in the current form in June 1947. The introduction of rationing in India dates back to the 1940s Bengal famine. This rationing system was revived in the wake of acute food shortage during the early 1960s, before the Green Revolution. It involves two types, RPDS and TPDS.  In 1992, PDS became RPDS (Revamped PDS) focusing the poor families, especially in the far-flung, hilly, remote and inaccessible areas. In 1997 RPDS became TPDS (Targeted PDS) which established Fair Price Shops for the distribution of food grains at subsidised rates.

Center state responsibilities 
The central and state governments share the responsibility of regulating the PDS. While the central government is responsible for procurement, storage, transportation, and bulk allocation of food grains, state governments hold the responsibility for distributing the same to the consumers through the established network of fair price shops (FPSs). State governments are also responsible for operational responsibilities including allocation and identification of families below the poverty line, issue of ration cards, and supervision and monitoring the functioning of FPSs.

Fair price shop (FPS)
A public distribution shop, also known as fair price shop (FPS), is a part of India's public system established by the Government of India which distributes rations at a subsidised price to the poor. Locally these are known as ration shops and public distribution shops, and chiefly sell wheat, rice and sugar at a price lower than the market price called Issue Price. Other essential commodities may also be sold. To buy items one must have a ration card. These shops are operated throughout the country by joint assistance of central and state government. The items from these shops are much cheaper but are of average quality. Ration shops are now present in most localities, villages towns and cities. India has more than 5.5 lakh (0.55 million) shops, constituting the largest distribution network in the world (According to 2011 census).

Shortcomings 

The public distribution system of India is not without its defects. With a coverage of around 40 million below-poverty-line families, a review discovered the following structural shortcomings and disturbances:
 Growing instances of the consumers receiving inferior quality food grains in ration shops.
 Rogue dealers swap good supplies received from the Food Corporation of India (FCI) with inferior stock and sell the good quality FCI stock to private shopkeepers.
 Illicit fair price shop owners have been found to create large number of bogus cards to sell food grains in the open market.
 Many FPS dealers resort to malpractice, illegal diversions of commodities, holding and black marketing due to the minimum salary received by them.
 Numerous malpractices make safe and nutritious food inaccessible and un-affordable to many poor thus resulting in their food insecurity.
 Identification of households to be denoted status and distribution to granted PDS services has been highly irregular and diverse in various states. The recent development of Aadhar UIDAI cards has taken up the challenge of solving the problem of identification and distribution of PDs services along with Direct Cash Transfers.
 Regional allocation and coverage of FPS are unsatisfactory and the core objective of price stabilization of essential commodities has not met.
 There is no set criteria as to which families are above or below the poverty line. This ambiguity gives massive scope for corruption and fallouts in PDS systems because some who are meant to benefit are not able to.

Several schemes have augmented the number of people aided by PDS, but the number is extremely low. Poor supervision of FPS and lack of accountability have spurred middlemen who consume a good proportion of the stock meant for the poor. There is also no clarity as to which families should be included in the below the poverty line list and which are not. This results in the genuinely poor being excluded whilst the ineligible get several cards. Awareness about the presence of the PDS and FPS to poverty-stricken societies, namely the rural poor has been dismal.

The stock assigned to a single family cannot be bought in installments. This is a decisive barrier to the efficient functioning and overall success of PDS in India. Many families below the poverty line are not able to acquire ration cards either because they are seasonal migrant workers or because they live in unauthorized colonies. Many families also mortgage their ration cards for money. Lack of clarity in the planning and structuring of social safety and security programs in India has resulted in the creation of numerous cards for the poor. Limited information about the overall use of cards has discouraged families below the poverty line from registering for new cards and increased illegal creation of cards by such families to ensure maximum benefit for the family members.

Suggestions 
To improve the current system of the PDS, the following suggestions are furnished:
 Vigilance squad should be strengthened to detect corruption, which is an added expenditure for taxpayers.
 Personnel-in-charge of the department should be chosen locally.
 Margin of profit should be increased for honest business, in which case the market system is more apt anyway.
 F.C.I. and other prominent agencies should provide quality food grains for distribution, which is a tall order for an agency that has no real incentive to do so.
 Frequent checks and raids should be conducted to eliminate bogus and duplicate cards, which is again an added expenditure and not foolproof.
 The Civil Supplies Corporation should open more fair price shops in rural areas.
 The fair price dealers seldom display rate chart and quantity available in the block-boards in front of the shop. This should be enforced.
 some social activists have suggested that pulse is an importance source of protein so besides rice / wheat pulses like arhar (toor) should also be included in PDS system

In aggregate, only about 42% of subsidised grains issued by the central pool reach the target group, according to a Planning Commission study released in March 2008.

But the United Progressive Alliance, which came to power in 2004, decided on a common minimum programme (CMP) and on the agenda was food and nutrition security. Under that the government had plans to strengthen the food security program DS.

However, finance minister Arun Jaitley in his budget speech went contrary to the idea proposed in the CMP and proposed the idea of the food stamp scheme. He has proposed to try the scheme in few districts of India to see its viability.

In a 2014 judgment, Delhi High Court has ruled that fair price shops cannot be allotted to a below poverty line card holder.

Corruption and allegations
The Aaj Tak news channel on 14 October 2013 performed a sting operation on PDS named Operation Black. It showed how the distribution reaches mills instead of fair price shops.

NDTV produced a show which documented how the Government of Chhattisgarh's food department managed to fix its broken system so that the diversion of grain came down from about 50% in 2004–05 to about 10% in 2009–10.

Research on the PDS suggests (as these two programmes show) that the situation varies quite a lot across the country.

See also
 Direct Benefit Transfer
 Subsidies in India
 Malnutrition in India
 National Food Security Act, 2013

Notes

External links
 PDS - Department of Food and Public Distribution, Official website at Ministry of Consumer Affairs, Food and Public Distribution
 Public Distribution System (PDS), in 10th Plan at Planning Commission of India
 Public Distribution System: Introduction at Right to Food Campaign
 Food Banking India  at Delhi FoodBanking Network
  at Operation Black by Aaj Tak
 Excess Food Stocks, PDS and Procurement Policy Working Paper No. 5/2002-PC, by Arvind Virmani and P.V. Rajeev, Planning Commission, Government of India, December 2001
  at "EPDS Bihar"

Poverty in India
Ministry of Consumer Affairs, Food and Public Distribution
Welfare in India
Food politics
Food security
Civil Supplies
Food and drink in India